Esmann is a surname, likely of Danish origin. Notable people with the surname include:

Amir Esmann (born 1965), Swiss cinematographer
Frank Esmann (1939-2016), Danish journalist
Gustav Esmann (1860-1904), Danish journalist, author, scriptwriter, and master of ceremonies